Herz-9 is an Iranian, domestically built, mobile air defense system developed and unveiled in 2013.

Development 
In May 2013, the Ministry of Defense of the Islamic Republic of Iran announced that it had launched the mass production of a new Air defense system, called Herz-9.

Description 
According to Iran's Defense Minister Brigadier General Ahmad Vahidi, Herz-9 "can identify and target enemy helicopters, rockets, and fighter jets at low ranges and low altitudes of about 8-12 kilometers." He also said that "this mobile air defense system uses the most technologically advanced computer hardware and software and the latest navigation system available today."

References 

Iran says producing new air defense missile bigstory.ap.org
Defense minister inaugurates Herz 9 protector air defense system production line irandailybrief.com

External links 
Photos: Iran inaugurates mass-production of new air defence system ‘Herz 9’ theiranproject.com

Surface-to-air missiles of Iran
Guided missiles of Iran